Tetraphis is a genus of two species of mosses (Bryophyta). Its name refers to its four large peristome teeth.

References 

Tetraphidopsida
Moss genera